Viettesia matilei is a moth in the subfamily Arctiinae. It was described by Hervé de Toulgoët in 1978. It is found in the Comoros in the Indian Ocean.

References

Moths described in 1978
Lithosiini